The 2011 Norwich City Council election took place on 5 May 2011 to elect members of Norwich City Council in England. One third of seats were up for election. This was on the same day as other local elections and the nationwide referendum on the Alternative Vote.

All changes in vote share are calculated with reference to the 2007 election, the last time these seats were contested.

Summary
Labour gained Bowthorpe and Catton Grove from the Conservatives, while the Greens seized Thorpe Hamlet from the Liberal Democrats.

Labour  performed best against the Conservatives in their target seats, although they fell short in Wensum and Mancroft as the Green Party's support held up well.  The one Green Party gain came in Thorpe Hamlets against the Liberal Democrats, where their triumph meant all three of the ward's seats were now held by them. 
Despite their vote increasing on the previous elections in September 2010, the Conservatives still lost the only two seats they were defending.  Disappointing for them, their support rose in all but one of the seats they did not hold previously, while their support fell in the seats they were defending, Bowthorpe and Catton Grove.
As in the previous election, the Liberal Democrats were relegated to Eaton, while their support across the rest of the city fell sharply.

In the affluent south west of the city, the Conservatives and Liberal Democrats had fought very hard to win Eaton following the decision of sitting Liberal Democrat Councillor, Ros Wright (wife of Norwich South MP Simon Wright), to stand down.  The Liberal Democrats held on with Caroline Ackroyd securing a majority of 129, although there was a 4.9% swing to the Conservative candidate Chris Groves. Turnout was once again the highest in the city at 58.6%.

After the election, the new makeup of the City Council was:

 Labour  18 (+2)
 Greens 15 (+1)
 Liberal Democrats 4 (-1)
 Conservatives 2 (-2)

Turnout across the city was 40.2%, with the AV Referendum being seen as partly responsible for the marked rise.

Election result

Changes in vote share are relative to the last time these seats were contested in 2007.

Council Composition

Prior to the election the composition of the council was:

After the election, the composition of the council was:

Ward results

Bowthorpe

Catton Grove

Crome

Eaton

Lakenham

Mancroft

Miles Cross

Nelson

Sewell

Thorpe Hamlet

Town Close

University

Wensum

References 

2011 English local elections
2011
2010s in Norfolk